Ronald K. Pierce  (September 18, 1909 – March 5, 2008) was an American sound engineer. He won an Academy Award for Best Sound and was nominated for two more in the same category. He died in 2008 at the age of 98.

Selected filmography
Pierce won an Academy Award and was nominated for two more:

Won
 Earthquake (1974; co-won with Melvin Metcalfe Sr.)

Nominated
 Airport (1970; co-nominated with David H. Moriarty)
 The Sting (1973; co-nominated with Robert R. Bertrand)

References

External links

1909 births
2008 deaths
American audio engineers
Best Sound Mixing Academy Award winners
20th-century American engineers